Mónica Mariel Sánchez Cuadros (born. February 27, 1970) is a Peruvian actress. She was born in Lima.

Filmography

Movies
La Carnada (1999)
Captain Pantoja and the Special Services (1999)
Imposible Amor (2000)
Pasajeros (2008)

Telenovelas y miniseries
La Perricholi (1992)
Bolero (1993)
Las Mujeres de mi Vida (1993)
Los de Arriba y los de Abajo (1994)
Los unos y Los otros (1995)
Nino (1996)
Todo se compra, Todo se vende (1997)
"María Emilia, querida (1999)
Sarita Colonia (2002)
Eva del Edén (2004)
Sally, la muñequita del pueblo (2007-2008)
Al Fondo Hay Sitio (2009)
De vuelta al barrio (2017)

Theater
Sueño de una tarde dominical (2000)
Macbeth (2000)
Misericordia" (2008)

References

External links

1970 births
Living people
People from Lima
Peruvian actresses